His Name Was King is a 1971 Italian Western film directed by Giancarlo Romitelli and starring Richard Harrison and Klaus Kinski.

Plot
The bounty killer "King" Marley kills one of the Benson brothers, who are wanted smugglers. In retaliation the Bensons kill King's brother and rape his sister-in-law. While King goes after the gang the widow is taken in by King's friend sheriff Foster. She is raped again by his deputy who is then killed by Foster.

The government agent Collins has King arrested, but this turns out to be a ruse to catch the real boss of the smuggling activities, which in fact is Foster. Collins also assists King in the final reckoning with the sheriff.

Cast
 Richard Harrison as John 'King' Marley
 Klaus Kinski as Brian Foster
 Anne Puskin
 Tom Felleghy
 Lorenzo Fineschi
 Vassili Karis
 John Bartha
 Federico Boido (as Rick Boyd)
 Giorgio Dolfin
 Paolo Magalotti
 Osiride Pevarello
 Luciano Pigozzi as Mr. Collins
 Ada Pometti

Reception
In his investigation of narrative structures in Spaghetti Western films, Fridlund writes that His Name Was King is an example of vengeance stories with an "external second motive", where there besides the avenger is a second protagonist with a different motive. This is a variant of the partnership plot that was used in many Spaghetti Westerns following the success of For a Few Dollars More where one of the bounty killer partners turns out to have a secret vengeance motive. In His Name Was King the different motivations of Collins (ending the smuggling activities) and King (revenge) in the end brings them together - the initial conflict being a stratagem by Collins. Also, in the seminal Django the hero has two conflicting motives (avenging himself on the villain Jackson for stealing his fortune) that strongly influence the plot, while King's two motives (revenge and collecting bounty for the Bensons) do not come into conflict, thus presenting a weaker version of such an "internal second motive".

References

External links

1971 films
1971 Western (genre) films
1970s Italian-language films
Spaghetti Western films
Films about rape
Films scored by Luis Bacalov
1970s Italian films